The 1891 United States Senate election in Pennsylvania was held on January 20, 1891. J. Donald Cameron was re-elected by the Pennsylvania General Assembly to the United States Senate.

Results
The Pennsylvania General Assembly, consisting of the House of Representatives and the Senate, convened on January 20, 1891, to elect a Senator to fill the term beginning on March 4, 1891. Incumbent Republican J. Donald Cameron, who was elected in an 1877 special election and re-elected in 1879 and 1885, was a successful candidate for re-election to another term. The results of the vote of both houses combined are as follows:

|-
|-bgcolor="#EEEEEE"
| colspan="3" align="right" | Totals
| align="right" | 254
| align="right" | 100.00%
|}

See also 
 United States Senate elections, 1890 and 1891

References

External links
Pennsylvania Election Statistics: 1682-2006 from the Wilkes University Election Statistics Project

1891
Pennsylvania
United States Senate